Akanda is the 10th largest city in Gabon. It had a population of 34,548 in 2013. It is situated in the Estuaire Province.

See also
Akanda National Park
List of cities in Gabon

References

Populated places in Estuaire Province